WVNZ may refer to:

 WVNZ (AM), a radio station (1320 AM) licensed to serve Richmond, Virginia, United States
 WJFN-FM, a radio station (100.5 FM) licensed to serve Goochland, Virginia, which held the call sign WVNZ-FM in 2018